The Roots Blower Company was an American engineering company based in Connersville, Indiana.  It was founded in 1854 by the inventors Philander Higley Roots and Francis Marion Roots.  It is notable for the Roots blower, a type of pump. Today, Roots blowers are mainly used as air pumps in superchargers for internal combustion engines; they were first used in blast furnaces to blow combustion air to melt iron.

History

Legend of origin
The Roots brothers located their business in Connersville, Indiana, as the Whitewater Canal provided a convenient 11-foot (3.35 metre) drop, suitable for an undershot mill wheel. When this proved insufficiently powerful, Philander Roots built a more efficient "water motor" to exploit the power source. However, the lobe impellers were made of wood, which warped and caused the motor to jam when used under water. As the brothers studied the problem on dry land, one of them rotated a shaft, causing the impellers to spin in the air, "blowing off his brother's hat". This attracted the attention of the superintendent of an iron foundry, who observed to Roots that it could be used to help melt iron. Roots followed up the idea by designing the Roots blower, "now (1931) the leading product of the plant". The foundry superintendent was given the role of foundry foreman at Roots Blower.

Company history
The Roots brothers patented the Roots Blower in 1860. In 1869 they were granted a patent by the United Kingdom Patent Office for the invention of "improvements in rotary blowing machines."

In 1875, Roots exhibited a blower at the Saint Petersburg Exhibition; Thwaites and Carbutt exhibited a Roots principle "air blowing machine" for mine ventilation in the same exhibition.

In 1885, Edgar Dwight Johnston joined the firm of 30 people; he became vice president in 1889 and president in 1898, remaining so until at least 1931. At that time, the firm employed about 225 people.

In 1900, Gottlieb Daimler patented a Roots supercharger for a car's internal combustion engine.

In 1931, Roots Blower Company and Connersville Blower Company were bought by the International Derrick and Equipment Company to found Roots-Connersville Blower Company. The same year, the company began production of centrifugal compressors.

During World War II, the company made screw compressors for U.S. Navy submarines, which they used to blow ballast water.

Current production
From 1944, Roots became a product brand of Dresser Industries. In 2015 the Roots company was acquired by Colfax Corporation, and is now part of UK based engineering company Howden.  The Roots product line still includes a range of blowers.

Founders 
Francis Roots was born in Oxford, Ohio on 28 October 1824 to Alanson Roots and Sylvia Yale. He married Esther E. Pumphrey on 8 October 1850. He died in Connersville on 25 October 1889. His brother Philander died in Connersville in 1879.

See also 
 Supercharger — for a comparison of Roots with other types

References

External links 

 Indiana County History: Francis Marion Roots
 Animation of Roots Blower with 2 lobes
 Dresser Roots product catalogue, with timeline and company history
 Connersville Chamber of Commerce: History of Connersville Indiana
 

Manufacturing companies based in Indiana
Companies established in 1859
Historic American Engineering Record in Indiana
Pump manufacturers
1859 establishments in Indiana